Ernest Henry Putley (1922 – 29 November 2009) was a British scientist and prolific author. He is best known for his work on radar, the Hall Effect, and infra-red spectroscopy.

Putley was born in South London and graduated with a BSc in physics from Queen Mary College in 1942. In August 1942 he started work at the Telecommunications Research Establishment (TRE) in Malvern, which was later known as RSRE, DERA, and more recently Dstl & QinetiQ.  After the war he returned briefly to Queen Mary College to complete his PhD.

Putley retired from RSRE in 1982 but returned almost immediately as an unpaid volunteer to record the history of the military electronic developments with which he had been involved for so long.

Select bibliography

"Dr E.H. Putley on A.P. Rowe", pp. 31–33 in Latham, Colin & Stobbs, Anne (1999) "Pioneers of Radar", Sutton 
Putley, Ernest (2009) "Science comes to Malvern - TRE a Story of Radar 1942-1953", Aspect Design, Malvern

Lists
OCLC WorldCat - lists over 100 of Putley's works
Google books
Private Papers of Dr E H Putley, Imperial War Museum

References

1922 births
2009 deaths
British scientists
Alumni of Queen Mary University of London